Cistierna is a municipality located in the province of León, Castile and León, Spain. According to the 2019 census (INE), the municipality had a population of 3,135 inhabitants.

See also
 Kingdom of León
 Leonese language
 Province of Llión
 Llión

References

Municipalities in the Province of León